Billy Bush is a multi-Grammy nominated American record producer, audio engineer and mixer known for his work with Garbage, The Naked and Famous, Neon Trees, Julia Stone, Fink, Foster the People, Muse, Natasha Bedingfield, Jake Bugg, Ilse DeLange, and The Boxer Rebellion. He lives in Los Angeles and works from his studio "Red Razor Sounds" in Atwater Village.

In 1995, Bush was hired by Garbage to help reconcile the band's technology needs with their live performance for their first concert tour. Initially a guitar technician, he was promoted to production manager and live engineer. He remained with the group and performed audio engineering duties on each of their subsequent albums working closely with Butch Vig. He later worked on records alongside Vig including Beck, Alanis Morissette, Limp Bizkit, Korn and Ash. In 2010, Bush married Garbage lead singer Shirley Manson. He is currently represented by Global Positioning Services management.

Discography

References

Discography sources

 
 

Year of birth missing (living people)
Record producers from Missouri
Musicians from St. Louis
Living people
Businesspeople from St. Louis